Erik Røring Møinichen (15 December 1797 – 7 February 1875) was a Norwegian politician.

Personal life
Møinichen was born in Trondhjem as a son of district stipendiary magistrate Thomas Henrich Møinichen (1758–1845) and Ingeborg Birgitte Røring, Sr. He was an older brother of Ingeborg Birgitte Møinichen, Jr, who married into the Lie family and was a mother of Erika (Nissen) and Ida Lie and mother-in-law of Jonas Lie. Erik Røring Møinichen even had one of Jonas' sons, Erik Røring Møinichen Lie, named after him. Through another sibling, he was an uncle of Frithjof M. Plahte.

Møinichen married Laura Emilie Sørensen (1812–1888) from Skien.

Career
He held the cand.jur. degree and was hired in the Norwegian Ministry of Justice and the Police in 1827. He is known for his work with the prison service, and was a driving force behind the building of Botsfengselet which was completed in 1851. He was a board member of Norsk Hoved-Jernbane until 1854, when the first railway was opened in Norway.

In politics, Møinichen served as mayor of Christania in 1842 and 1843. He was then the County Governor of Akershus from 1843 to 1855. He was elected to the Parliament of Norway in 1851, representing the constituency of Christiania og Lillehammer, and served one term. From 1855 to 1870 he was a government minister.

He was the Minister of Auditing from January to May 1855, then a member of the Council of State Division in Stockholm. After exactly one year, on 1 June 1856, he became Minister of Finance. On 1 August 1857 he became Minister of Justice and the Police, where he stayed until 31 August 1858 except for a time between September and November 1857. In August 1858 he also became Minister of Finance, which he was until 30 September 1859. He was then a member of the Council of State Division in Stockholm for thirteen months. Then, from November 1860 to 30 September 1861 he was the Minister of Postal Affairs. He also became Minister of Justice on 12 December 1861 and remained so until the cabinet change on 17 December. From 1 September 1861 he was the Minister of Finance for twelve months, then a member of the Council of State Division in Stockholm for thirteen months, Minister of the Navy and Postal Affairs for twelve months, member of the Council of State Division in Stockholm for twelve months, Minister of Finance for twelve months, Minister of Justice for twelve months, and member of the Council of State Division in Stockholm for eight months. Then, on 1 June 1868 he became minister of Auditing again. From 1 October 1869 to 31 January 1870 he was Minister of Finance for the fifth time, concluding his involvement in Norwegian government.

References

1797 births
1875 deaths
Norwegian civil servants
Mayors of Oslo
County governors of Norway
Government ministers of Norway
19th-century Norwegian politicians
Ministers of Finance of Norway
Ministers of Justice of Norway